Maslyaninsky District is an administrative and municipal district (raion), one of the thirty in Novosibirsk Oblast, Russia. It is located in the east of the oblast. Its administrative center is the urban locality (a work settlement) of Maslyanino. Population: 24,438 (2010 Census);  The population of Maslyanino accounts for 53.6% of the district's total population.

Natural monuments
Barsukovskaya Cave is a Karst cave, the habitat of the largest wintering colony of bats in the southeast part of Western Siberia.

Notable residents 

Grigoriy Krivosheyev (1929–2019), Colonel General and military historian, born in the village of Kinterep, Legostayevsky

References

Notes

Sources

Districts of Novosibirsk Oblast